Lucy Charles-Barclay (born 15 September 1993) is an English professional triathlete specialising in the Ironman and 70.3 distances, who is the 2021 World Champion in that discipline. Prior to taking up triathlon, Charles was an elite distance and open water swimmer. She attempted to gain selection for the British swimming team for the 2012 Olympic trials in both the pool and open water. She was, however, unsuccessful, despite having beaten open water trials winner Keri-anne Payne in the Great North Swim a month previously. Charles subsequently made her debut in triathlon in 2014 and went on to win the 18–24 women’s age category at the 2015 Ironman World Championship as an amateur. She subsequently turned professional. Husband, Reece Barclay is a British professional IronMan triathlete as-well and also coaches Lucy at the professional level. 

During her first Ironman of 2018, the African Ironman Championship, she set a new personal best time of 8:56:10. This beat her previous best from the 2017 Ironman Worlds, where she came in with a time of 8:59:48 and was a runner-up behind Daniela Ryf.

In 2021, she won the Ironman 70.3 World Championship, finishing over 8 minutes faster than her nearest competitor.

Early years 
Charles was born north of London, England. When Charles was 8 years old, she started swimming. A year later she was beating other swimmers that were three or four years older than her. She convinced her coaches to let her compete in events such as the 200-meter butterfly. By the age of 16 she was a national champion. In 2010, there was a test event in which Charles competed, she finished 16th, the top competitor from Great Britain. She was 17 at the time and it was her first ever 10K swim. The Olympic Games 2012 were hosted in London, and the 10K open-water swim, which is seen as the marathon in swimming, was part of it for the second time.

For the 2012 Olympics, Charles's biggest competitor was Keri-Anne Payne, who had already won an Olympic silver medal at the open water debut in 2008. Although Charles was doing really well on the build up towards the Olympics it wasn’t enough to be selected. Britain had only one slot, which went to Payne. Charles who was still a teenager at the time was so devastated, that at some point in 2013 she lost the motivation to only keep swimming for the next Olympic opportunity in 2016.

In 2014, at age 19, she started her first triathlon. At the time Charles had no experience of competitive  running or cycling. In her second year, in 2015, Charles not only qualified for the World Championships but won in her age-group. In the same year, she became U23 World Champion in Ironman 70.3. In 2016 she became a professional triathlon athlete.

Triathlon career 
In May 2017, Charles won Ironman Lanzarote. Furthermore she also won the Challenge Family's The Championship. She also won a second place at the Ironman European Championships. She won the swim in that race in 48:29 minutes and finished the race only 4 minutes behind winner Sarah Crowley. At the Ironman World Championship in October 2017, she again landed a second place behind four time World Champion Daniela Ryf.

In April 2018, at Ironman South Africa, Charles won her second Ironman race. In the same year she again won Challenge's The Championship. In September, she came second at the Ironman 70.3 World Championships. At the 2018 Ironman World Championship in October she again landed in second place behind Daniela Ryf and broke the swim record with 48:13 minutes. Her overall time of 8:36:24 is the second fastest in race history.

In 2019, Charles won Challenge Roth and the European Ironman Championships with her personal record of 8:31:09 hours for the entire race.

She followed that with a third consecutive second place finish at the 2019 Ironman World Championship, clocking 8:46:44.

In 2021, she won the Ironman 70.3 World Championship, finishing over 8 minutes faster than her nearest competitor.

Charles lives in Chingford, Essex, and is coached by her husband Reece.

Notable results
Some of Lucy Charles's notable achievements include:

References

External links

International Triathlon Union athlete profile
Profile at roka.com
Lucy Charles about Olympic ambitions
Lucy Charles athlete profile at redbull.com
24 hours with Lucy Charles heading into Kona
Ironman tips from swimming record holder

1993 births
Living people
English female triathletes
People from Hoddesdon
Sportspeople from Hertfordshire
English female swimmers